The Solheim Cup is a biennial women's golf competition between teams from Europe and the United States. The first Solheim Cup took place in 1990.

For details of individual players' complete Solheim Cup records see: List of European Solheim Cup golfers and List of American Solheim Cup golfers.

Summary 
There have been a total of 444 individual matches played in the 17 Solheim Cups. Of these the United States has won 196, Europe has won 181 with 67 matches halved. Thus the United States have scored a total of 229½ points to Europe's 214½.

Holes-in-one

Europe

United States 
None

Largest margins of victory in a match 
All victories by 5 or more holes are listed.

Europe 

In 2011 Cristie Kerr conceded her match against Karen Stupples at the start, because of injury, resulting in a 10 & 8 defeat.

United States

Pairings

Most frequent pairings 
Pairings used 6 or more times are listed.

Europe

United States

Age-related records 
The ages given are on the first day of the Solheim Cup. Generally the leading 5 in each category are given.

Youngest players

Europe

United States

Oldest players

Europe 

United States 

Captains 
Youngest Solheim Cup captain: Catrin Nilsmark -  in 2003
Youngest United States captain: Patty Sheehan -  in 2002
Oldest Solheim Cup captain: Juli Inkster -  in 2019
Oldest European captain: Catriona Matthew -  in 2021

Source:

References

Records